Enterprise Island or Isla Lientur or Isla Nansen Norte or North Nansen Island is an island that is  long and lies at the northeast end of Nansen Island in Wilhelmina Bay, off the west coast of Graham Land. Today, a visit to Enterprise Island is often part of Antarctic cruises.

Enterprise Island and Nansen Island were first charted as one feature and named "Île Nansen" by the Belgian Antarctic Expedition under Adrien de Gerlache in 1898. The islands became well known to whalers operating in the area in the early 1900s and the names North Nansen Island and South Nansen Island were used to distinguish them. Since Nansen Island has now become established for the larger feature, the new name Enterprise Island has been given to the smaller island by the United Kingdom Antarctic Place-names Committee (UK-APC), commemorating the enterprise of the whalers who made the anchorage at the south side of the island at Foyn Harbor, a major center of summer industry during the period 1916–1930.  Foyn Harbor was first surveyed by T. W. Bagshawe and M. C. Lester in 1921–22.  It was named by whalers after the whaling factory ship Svend Foyn, which was moored here during 1921–22.

See also 
 Composite Antarctic Gazetteer
 List of Antarctic and sub-Antarctic islands
 List of Antarctic islands south of 60° S
 Nansen Island
 SCAR
 Territorial claims in Antarctica

References

External links 
 Report from a visit to Enterprise Island with a picture of a whaler's wreck at Enterprise Island
Foyn Harbor

Islands of Graham Land
Danco Coast